Deer Creek Bridge, Railroad was a historic railroad bridge in Hopewell Township and Shrewsbury Township, York County, Pennsylvania.  It was built about 1895, and measures  and  overall. The girder bridge was built by the Stewartstown Railroad.  The bridge crosses Deer Creek.

It was added to the National Register of Historic Places in 1995.

References

Railroad bridges on the National Register of Historic Places in Pennsylvania
Bridges completed in 1895
Bridges in York County, Pennsylvania
National Register of Historic Places in York County, Pennsylvania
Girder bridges in the United States